Yevheniy Lozovyi (born 25 March 1988) is a Ukrainian football midfielder who plays for Viktoriya Mykolaivka.

Lozovyi is a product of the Kharkiv city youth sportive school. In June 2015 he signed a contract with Moldavian FC Dacia Chișinău.

Honours
Metal Kharkiv
 Ukrainian Second League: 2020–21

References

External links

1988 births
Living people
Footballers from Kharkiv
Ukrainian footballers
Ukrainian expatriate footballers
Expatriate footballers in Moldova
Expatriate footballers in Georgia (country)
FC Helios Kharkiv players
FC UkrAhroKom Holovkivka players
FC Hirnyk-Sport Horishni Plavni players
FC Dacia Chișinău players
Ukrainian expatriate sportspeople in Moldova
Ukrainian expatriate sportspeople in Georgia (country)
FC Naftovyk-Ukrnafta Okhtyrka players
FC Rukh Lviv players
FC Metalist Kharkiv players
FC Viktoriya Mykolaivka players
FC Shevardeni-1906 Tbilisi players
Association football midfielders
Ukrainian First League players
Ukrainian Second League players